The red-bellied racer (Alsophis rufiventris) is a species of Colubrid snake that is endemic to the Lesser Antilles in the Caribbean, where it is found on the islands of Saba, Sint Eustatius, Saint Kitts, and Nevis.

Males have black-bordered blotches that transition into a dark mid-dorsal stripe towards the posterior.  Females have a series of middorsal streaks and smudges that fade towards the posterior.

Other common names include the Saba racer and the orange-bellied racer.

References

.
.

External links
Alsophis rufiventris at the Encyclopedia of Life
Alsophis rufiventris at the Reptile Database

Alsophis
Snakes of the Caribbean
Fauna of Saba
Fauna of Sint Eustatius
Reptiles of Saint Kitts and Nevis
Reptiles described in 1854
Taxa named by André Marie Constant Duméril
Taxa named by Gabriel Bibron
Taxa named by Auguste Duméril
Taxonomy articles created by Polbot